Lionel Messi is an Argentine professional footballer who has represented the Argentina national football team as a forward since his debut in 2005. Since then, Messi has scored 98 goals in 172 international appearances, making him the country's all-time top scorer; he surpassed Gabriel Batistuta's record of 54 goals with a free kick against the United States in the semi-final of the Copa América Centenario on 21 June 2016. He also holds the record for most goals by a South American male, surpassing Pelé‘s 77 goals with a hat-trick against Bolivia in September 2021. Messi made his debut for Argentina in a 2–1 away win over Hungary on 17 August 2005, and scored his first international goal a year later in his sixth appearance, against Croatia.

Messi's goal against Serbia and Montenegro, on 16 June 2006, at the age of 18 years and 357 days, made him the youngest-ever scorer for Argentina at a FIFA World Cup. He has scored eight international hat-tricks, and has netted twice in a match on ten occasions. In a June 2022 friendly against Estonia, Messi scored five goals in a match for Argentina for the first time. Out of all his opponents, Messi has scored the most against Bolivia, netting eight goals in total.

29 of Messi's goals have come in FIFA World Cup qualifiers. Additionally, he has netted 13 in the Copa América, leading his team to victory in the 2021 edition of the tournament; furthermore, he also reached the final with Argentina in 2007, 2015 and 2016. At the 2015 Copa América, he allegedly rejected the tournament's Best Player award, and the trophy was omitted from the ceremony. Nonetheless, he received the Best Player award and accepted it for his performances in the 2021 tournament. Messi has scored thirteen times in FIFA World Cup tournaments, a record for Argentina; Messi netted once in 2006, four in 2014, when he guided his team to the final, being awarded the Golden Ball for best player, once in 2018 and another seven in 2022, when he captained Argentina to their third World Cup Trophy, scoring twice in the final and winning the Golden Ball for a record second time. The remainder of Messi's goals, 44, have come in friendlies.

Goals 

 Scores and results list Argentina's goal tally first, score column indicates score after each Messi goal.

Hat-tricks

Statistics

See also 
 List of career achievements by Lionel Messi
 List of men's footballers with 500 or more goals
 List of men's footballers with 100 or more international caps
 List of men's footballers with 50 or more international goals
 List of top international men's football goal scorers by country
 Lists of hat-tricks
 List of international goals scored by Gabriel Batistuta
 List of international goals scored by Diego Maradona
 List of international goals scored by Alfredo Di Stéfano

References

External links 
 

International goals
Messi, Lionel
Messi, Lionel